Donald Gleasner was an American football player. He played as an end and guard at the University of Maryland. In 1945, his senior year, Maryland was coached by the legendary Bear Bryant. Their penultimate game of the season was in Washington, D.C. against then 13th-ranked and undefeated Virginia (7–0). In the game's final seconds, Gleasner caught a 50–yard pass from tailback Bill Poling for the game-winning touchdown. At Maryland, Gleasner was also member of the Alpha Sigma chapter of the Delta Sigma Phi fraternity where he served as the vice-president. Gleasner was selected in the 28th round of the 1946 NFL Draft (262nd overall) by the Boston Yanks.

References

Maryland Terrapins football players
Boston Yanks players